Ananias Fingkreuw (born 11 October 1992), is an Indonesian professional footballer who plays as a forward for Liga 2 club PSBS Biak.

Club career
Fingkreuw started his career in the Persipura Jayapura's junior team. Then he joined several teams at different levels of competition, from Persemi Mimika, PS Siak, Persiju Sijunjung, PSIR Rembang, and PSBL Langsa.

He who has started his professional career then played at Semen Padang in 2018, PSBS Biak and Madura in 2019, until finally in 2020, he joined PSMS Medan in the 2020 Liga 2.

PSMS Medan
He was signed for PSMS Medan to play in Liga 2 in the 2020 season. This season was suspended on 27 March 2020 due to the COVID-19 pandemic. The season was abandoned and was declared void on 20 January 2021.

Return to PSBS Biak
He was signed for PSBS Biak to play in Liga 2 in the 2021 season. Fingkreuw made his league appearance on 7 October 2021, coming on as a starter in a 1–1 draw against Mitra Kukar at the Tuah Pahoe Stadium. On 20 October 2021, Fingkreuw scored his first goal for PSBS against Sulut United in the 66th minute from the penalty at the Tuah Pahoe Stadium, Palangkaraya.

References

External links
 Ananias Fingkreuw at ligaindonesiabaru

1992 births
Living people
Indonesian footballers
Association football forwards
Semen Padang F.C. players
PSBS Biak Numfor players
Persipura Jayapura players
PSPS Pekanbaru players
PSMS Medan players